The Chemical Industries Association (CIA) is the leading national trade association representing and advising chemical and pharmaceutical companies located across the United Kingdom.

Chemicals manufacturing in the UK is largely concentrated in the northern regions of the UK and Scotland, in four key chemical Clusters and are represented locally by well-organised Cluster Teams. In Scotland by Chemicals Team Scotland, Northwest England represented by Chemicals Northwest, Northeast England represented the Northeast of England Process Industry Cluster (NEPIC) and in Yorkshire and Humber by Yorkshire Chemical Focus and Humber Chemical Focus.

Function
The CIA represents member companies at both national and international level. The CIA carries out advocacy on behalf of its members' interests. Its remit is to "articulate members’ collective hopes and concerns; improve appreciation of the situation amongst UK and European governments, the media and other key stakeholders; and help address the global competitive issues encountered by our members."

Structure
The CIA currently has around 140 members. These members operate from around 200 sites within the UK. The Association is headed by an elected council of 25 industry executives. It is a requirement of membership that companies that committed to 
Responsible Care principles. Currently, the CIA is presided over by Tom Crotty, Director of INEOS.

The CIA owns and supports Chemicals Northwest.

See also
 Association of the British Pharmaceutical Industry
 Chemical industry
 Northeast of England Process Industry Cluster
 UK Trade & Investment

References

External links
 Chemical Industries Association
 Chemical Industry Awards
 Chemicals Northwest
CIABATA
REACHReady

Chemical industry in the United Kingdom
Chemistry trade associations
Trade associations based in the United Kingdom
Pharmaceutical industry in the United Kingdom